Baby is a 2016 Indian Odia film directed by K.M Krishna and produced under Saurav Entertainment. Anubhav Mohanty, Preeti Priyadarshini, Poulomi Das and Jhilik Bhattacharya are in the lead roles.

Mahurat of the film in Gadagadia Temple, Cuttack on 31 July 2016 and is scheduled for a release on Dussehra 2016. It is remake of Tamil movie Pichaikkaran.The music is released by Amara Muzik.

Cast
 Anubhav Mohanty
 Preeti Priyadarshini
 Poulomi Das
 Jhilik Bhattacharjee

Soundtrack

The music of Baby is composed by Prem Anand while the lyrics are penned by Arun Mantri and Subrat Swain . The full soundtrack was launched on 1 October 2016. Prior to that, Two Songs were released for "Baby (Title song)" and "Sun Zara" on 24 and 26 September respectively. And promotional videos of the songs "Askaa 40" and "Baby (Title song)" were released on 25 and 27 September respectively.

References

2010s Odia-language films
2016 films
Odia remakes of Tamil films